Im Hye-kyung (Hangul: 임혜경, born August 19, 1991), better known by the stage names Cheeze (Hangul: 치즈) and Dalchong (Hangul: 달총), is a South Korean singer and the only remaining member of Cheeze. She released her first solo single on February 20, 2017. In addition, she is also a member of the special all-female project called CSVC.

Discography

Extended plays

Singles

Soundtrack appearances

References

1991 births
Living people
South Korean rock singers
21st-century South Korean women singers